The Aero A.8 was the last realised construction of ing. Karel Rösner in the Aero factory. It was a passenger biplane for 4 passengers. Unlike most passenger airplanes of the time, which had the pilot seat positioned behind the wings, the pilot of A.8 was sitting under the leading edge of the wing. During the flight tests the airplane crashed in an accident into the wooden building of Main Aviation Workshops in Kbely. The development of the airplane was then abandoned.

Specifications (A.8)

References 

1920s Czechoslovakian airliners
Single-engined tractor aircraft
A8
Biplanes
Aircraft first flown in 1921